Rocko Schamoni, (born May 8, 1966), real name Tobias Albrecht, is a German entertainer, author, musician, club proprietor and member of the comedy ensemble Studio Braun.

Biography 

Rocko Schamoni was born  in Lütjenburg. He released his first vinyl-single Liebe kann man sich nicht kaufen in 1987 followed by a lot of albums and singles. In 1998 he started the project Studio Braun with two other musicians from Hamburg.

In 2000 he also started authoring books. Rocko Schamoni released three autobiographical novels called Risiko des Ruhms (2000), Dorfpunks (2004) and Sternstunden der Bedeutungslosigkeit (2007). Dorfpunks became a German success, an autobiography narrating Schamoni's youth first as a fan of punk and then as a punk himself in his village Lütjenburg at the end of the 70s and at the beginning of the 80s. Schamoni was invited to several well-known TV shows as TV Total to promote his novel.

Together with Schorsch Kamerun and others Rocko Schamoni co-founded the Golden Pudel nightclub in Hamburg, well known as a hub of the Hamburger Schule movement.

Additionally he works as part-time actor also known as King Rocko Schamoni, Bims Brohm, IBM City Star, Mike Strecker, and Silvio Strecker.

Discography

Studio albums
 1988: Vision (LP, Weser Label)
 1989: Jeans und Elektronik (LP/LP lim. mit Flexi-Disc/CD/MC, Polydor)
 1990: Disco
 1993: Ex-Leben (mit Motion)(CD, What’s so funny about)
 1995: Galerie Tolerance
 1996: Die frühen Werke des Monsieur 70 Volt
 1999: Showtime (DoCD inkl. Remixe, Trikont)
 2002: Der Schwere Duft von Anarchie (CD, Virgin)
 2003: The Best of Rocko Schamoni (DoCD/LP, Trikont)
 2007: Rocko Schamoni & Little Machine (CD, Trikont; LP, Nobistor)

Singles
 1987: Liebe kann man sich nicht kaufen (7“-Weser Label)
 1990: Ich will Liebe (7“-Vinyl, Weser Label; Maxi-CD/12“-Vinyl, Polydor)
 1990: Was kostet Liebe (7“-Vinyl, Polydor)
 1990: Mendocino (Duet with Michael Holm)
 1991: Nackt in Las Vegas (7“-Vinyl/Maxi-CD, Polydor)
 1999: Showtime Remixe (12“-Vinyl, Trikont)
 2002: Geld ist eine Droge (Maxi-CD, Virgin)
 2002: Heart of Plastic (12“-Vinyl/Maxi-CD, Virgin)
 2005: Mauern (Maxi-CD, Trikont; 7“-Vinyl, Nobistor)
 2006: Muster (Maxi-CD, Trikont; 7“-Vinyl, Nobistor)
 2010: Mein Hass (7“-Vinyl, Duet with Cordelia Waal, Music and Production: Rockford Kabine)

Bibliography
 2000: Risiko des Ruhms
 2004: Dorfpunks
 2007: Risiko des Ruhms: Director's Cut
 2007: Sternstunden der Bedeutungslosigkeit
 2011: Tag der geschlossenen Tür
 2014: Fünf Löcher im Himmel

Filmography
 1988: Ballhaus Barmbek
 1990: Rollo Aller!
 1992: Rollo Aller! 2
 1993: Die Ratte
 2004: Jazzclub – Der frühe Vogel fängt den Wurm
 2005: Wir waren niemals hier
 2005: 
 2007: 20.000 Jahre Studio Braun – Ein Jubiläum feiert Geburtstag (DVD)
 2008: 
 2008: Rollo Aller! 4
 2009: Dorfpunks
 2012:

References

External links
 

1966 births
Living people
German-language singers
German male musicians
Musicians from Hamburg
German male writers